The Stepfather is a 1987 American psychological horror film directed by Joseph Ruben and starring Terry O'Quinn, Jill Schoelen, and Shelley Hack. O'Quinn stars as an identity-assuming serial killer who marries a widow with a teenage daughter. Having killed his previous family and changed his identity, his murderous tendencies continue after his stepdaughter becomes suspicious of him. The film is loosely based on the life of mass murderer John List, although the plot is more commonly associated with slasher films of the era. The film was written by Donald E. Westlake, from a story by Westlake, Carolyn Lefcourt, and Brian Garfield with an uncredited rewrite by David Loughery.

The film was theatrically released in the United States on January 23, 1987. It grossed $2.5 million at the box office and was well-received by critics. It has since gained a cult following and was followed by two sequels, Stepfather II (1989) and Stepfather III (1992), and a remake, also called The Stepfather, released in 2009.

Plot 
Henry Morrison assumes a different identity in the attempt to find the perfect family. In the beginning of the movie, he washes off blood in a bathroom after murdering the family he had been living with. He then changes his appearance and puts his belongings into a suitcase. Henry leaves through the front door of his house, nonchalantly passing the butchered remains of his family. Boarding a ferry, Henry throws the suitcase containing the objects from his former life into the ocean. One year later, Henry—now operating as a real estate agent named Jerry Blake in the suburbs of Seattle—has married the widow Susan Maine. Jerry's relationship with Susan's 16-year-old daughter, Stephanie, is strained. Her psychiatrist, Dr. Bondurant, advises her to give Jerry a chance. Stephanie, meanwhile, has a lot of behavioral issues at school and is skeptical of Jerry and his intentions.

Meanwhile, Jim Ogilvie, the brother of Jerry's murdered previous wife, runs an article about his sister's murder in the newspaper and attempts to find the man that killed his sister. While hosting a neighborhood barbecue, Jerry discovers the article and is disturbed by it. Jerry goes into the basement of the house and begins maniacally rambling to himself, unaware that Stephanie has also entered the basement. Discovering his stepdaughter, Jerry brushes off his outbursts by saying that he was simply letting off steam. He tells her not to worry. Stephanie finds the newspaper mentioning Jerry's earlier killings and comes to believe her stepfather is the murderer mentioned in the article. She writes a letter to the newspaper requesting a photo of Henry Morrison, but Jerry intercepts the photo in the mail and replaces it with a stranger's photo, allaying her suspicions.

Curious about Stephanie's stepfather, who has repeatedly refused to meet him, Dr. Bondurant makes an appointment with Jerry under an assumed name, saying he wants to buy a house. During their meeting, Bondurant asks too many personal questions and Jerry realizes that Bondurant is not who he says he is, and, mistakenly believing he is an undercover cop, beats him to death and puts him in Bondurant's car. He then sets the car on fire. The next day, Jerry informs Stephanie of Bondurant's death, claiming he was in a car accident, and succeeds in bonding with her. Jerry's newfound relationship with his stepdaughter is quickly cut short when he catches Stephanie kissing her boyfriend, Paul. Jerry accuses Paul of attempting to rape Stephanie, which causes an argument with Stephanie and Susan, and drives Paul away. Stephanie runs out on Jerry and Susan because Susan says Jerry is her father, though he is not. The next day, Jerry quits his job and creates a new identity for himself in another town. He begins to court another widow, while planning to get rid of Susan and Stephanie.

Having discovered where Jerry is now living, Jim  begins going door to door, in search of his former brother-in-law. After Jim stops by, Susan phones the real estate agency to tell Jerry that someone was looking for him, only to be informed that Jerry quit several days ago. Susan asks Jerry, but, while explaining himself to Susan, Jerry confuses his identities and Susan realizes Stephanie was right about him. Realizing his mistake, Jerry bashes Susan on the head with the phone and knocks her down the basement stairs. Content that Susan is dead, Jerry then sets out to kill Stephanie.

Jim, who has realized Jerry is the man who killed his family, arrives wielding a revolver, but Jerry stabs him to death before Jim can shoot him. After terrorizing Stephanie, he corners her in the attic, only to fall through the weak floor down to the bathroom. Susan shoots Jerry twice when he tries to attack Stephanie, and Stephanie stabs him in the chest. He weakly utters "I love you" and tumbles down the stairs. Stephanie later cuts down a birdhouse she and Jerry had built during the time they bonded.

Cast

Production

Development
The film was inspired by the crimes of John List. Lefcourt found a newspaper article about how List killed his own family and brought it to Garfield.  Westlake collaborated with them to write the story and based his screenplay on that.

Filming and post-production
Filming started on October 16, 1985 in Vancouver, British Columbia, Canada and by July 1986 the film was in post-production searching for a distributor company. Eventually The Stepfather gained a deal with New Century Vista Film Corporation.

Music

Soundtrack
 "Run Between the Raindrops" – Pat Benatar
 "Sleeping Beauty" – Divinyls
 "I Want You" – Patrick Moraz and John McBurnie
 "Gwine to Rune All Night (De Camptown Races)" – Stephen Foster

Release

Home media
The film was released on DVD for the first time in North America by Shout! Factory on October 13, 2009. Shout! Factory released the Blu-ray version of the film on June 15, 2010.

Reception

Box office
The Stepfather was initially marketed as a psychological thriller.  When audiences did not respond to this as well as New Century would have liked, they marketed it as a slasher film.  The film was theatrically released in the United States on January 23, 1987. During its opening weekend, The Stepfather grossed $260,587 in 105 theatres. Ultimately playing in 148 theatres, it earned a total US gross of $2.5 million.

Critical response 
The Stepfather has an 89% approval rating from Rotten Tomatoes and an average rating of 7/10 out of 35 reviews. Film critic Roger Ebert with the Chicago Sun-Times gave the movie 2.5 stars out of 4 and wrote, "Violence itself seems to sell at the box office, even when it's divorced from any context. Maybe that's what the filmmakers were thinking. What often happens, though, is that in an otherwise flawed film there are a couple of things that are wonderful. The Stepfather has one wonderful element: Terry O'Quinn's performance."

Terry O'Quinn was nominated for both a Saturn and an Independent Spirit Award. O'Quinn came in third place in the voting for the 1987 National Society of Film Critics Award for Best Actor. Director Ruben was honored with the Critics Award at the 1988 Cognac Festival. The film was nominated for the International Fantasy Film Award for Best Film at the 1990 Fantasporto, and included in Bravo's 100 Scariest Movie Moments at spot #70. 

Describing it as a cult film, Scott Tobias interprets the film as a critique of Reaganism.

Accolades

Sequels

The film was followed by the sequel Stepfather II in 1989, which opened to negative reviews. The TV movie Stepfather III was released in 1992, with the title character played by another actor.

Remake

A remake titled The Stepfather was released in 2009 to negative reviews.

References

External links

 
 
 

1987 films
1987 horror films
1987 independent films
1980s psychological thriller films
American horror thriller films
American independent films
Horror films based on actual events
American serial killer films
Uxoricide in fiction
Fiction about familicide
Films set in Washington (state)
Films shot in British Columbia
Films directed by Joseph Ruben
ITC Entertainment films
American psychological horror films
1980s English-language films
1980s American films